Buffington is a surname. Notable people with the surname include: 

 Adelbert Rinaldo Buffington (1837–1922), American soldier
 Byron Buffington (1852–1929), American politician
 Charlie Buffinton (born Buffington, 1861–1907), American baseball player
 George Buffington (1825–1893), American politician
 Joseph Buffington (1855–1947), American judge
 Joseph Buffington (congressman) (1803–1872), American member of Congress
 Thomas Buffington (1855–1938), American Indian Chief